Frank Trimble O'Hair (March 12, 1870 – August 3, 1932) was a U.S. Representative from Illinois.

Biography
He was born near Paris, Illinois on March 12, 1870. O'Hair attended the common schools and was graduated from the law department of De Pauw University in Greencastle, Indiana, in 1893. He joined the Illinois State Bar Association the same year and commenced practice in Paris, Illinois. O'Hair was elected as a Democrat to the Sixty-third Congress from March 4, 1913, to March 3, 1915, defeating former Speaker of the House Joseph Gurney Cannon.

He was an unsuccessful candidate for reelection in 1914 to the Sixty-fourth Congress, losing to Cannon (who regained his seat). This repeated the  pattern of fellow Democratic banker Samuel T. Busey who took Cannon's seat for one congressional interval 22 years earlier. Afterwards, he returned to banking. He resumed the practice of his profession in Paris, Illinois, until his death there August 3, 1932. He was interred in Edgar Cemetery.

References

External links
 

1870 births
1932 deaths
American bankers
Democratic Party members of the United States House of Representatives from Illinois
People from Paris, Illinois
DePauw University alumni